KHGG-FM is a radio station in Mansfield, Arkansas, broadcasting at 103.5 MHz FM to the Fort Smith market, ranked by Arbitron as the nation's 176th largest market.

History
The station was originally a low-power FM station with the call letters KRWA (K Radio Waldron Arkansas), playing country music and southern gospel. It was put on the air by Haskell Jones, who owned two radio stations in DeQueen at the time. KRWA went through a number of owners. After a power upgrade by Family Communications in 2003, it received a license to broadcast with 50,000 watts of power. The signal can currently be heard in most of Western Arkansas and Eastern Oklahoma.

Pharis Broadcasting purchased the station in 2003, installing an adult contemporary format. The station was known as "Hit 103" for nearly two years. In March 2005, the station installed an all sports format utilizing Fox Sports Radio.

On October 6, 2017, KHGG-FM went silent, while its programming remains on KAGE 1580 AM Van Buren.

Until October 2017, the station was the area's official home for Arkansas Razorbacks football, basketball, and baseball. It is also home of the Dallas Cowboys. Other area colleges and high school sporting events including the UAFS Lions basketball games can be heard on the station throughout the winter.

The station is owned and operated by Pharis Broadcasting.

Previous logo

References

External links

HGG
Radio stations established in 2003